Exodeoxyribonuclease I (EC 3.1.11.1, Escherichia coli exonuclease I, E. coli exonuclease I, exonuclease I) is an enzyme that catalyses the following chemical reaction:

 Exonucleolytic cleavage in the 3′- to 5′-direction to yield nucleoside 5′-phosphates

Preference for single-stranded DNA. The Escherichia coli enzyme hydrolyses glucosylated DNA.
Punjabi

References

External links 
 

EC 3.1.11